For the results of the Tahiti national football team, see:

Tahiti national football team results (1952–1999)
Tahiti national football team results (2000–2019)